John Benton is an American football coach who is the offensive line coach and run game coordinator  for the New York Jets of the National Football League (NFL).
 He previously served as an assistant coach for the San Francisco 49ers, Jacksonville Jaguars, Miami Dolphins, Houston Texans and St. Louis Rams.

College career
Benton attended Colorado State University (CSU), where he played offensive line for the Colorado State Rams football team. He earned honorable mention All-WAC honors during his junior and senior seasons and was named to the WAC's All-Academic team as a senior. He was also named to the Colorado State University Football All Century Team for the years 1893–1993.

Coaching career

Dolphins
In 2014 and 2015 he worked as the offensive line coach for the Dolphins.

Jaguars
In 2016 Benton coached with the Jaguars.

49ers
Benton was hired by the San Francisco 49ers as their offensive line coach in February 2017. He tested positive for COVID-19 and missed the team's week 14 game in 2020 against the Washington Football Team.

Jets
In January 2021, Benton was hired by the New York Jets as their offensive line coach.

Personal life
On March 18, 2022 Benton was arrested and charged with driving under the influence.

References

1963 births
Living people
Miami Dolphins coaches
Colorado State Rams football coaches
St. Louis Rams coaches
California Vulcans football coaches
Houston Texans coaches
Jacksonville Jaguars coaches
San Francisco 49ers coaches
National Football League replacement players
New York Jets coaches